Billboard Top Rock'n'Roll Hits: 1974 is a compilation album released by Rhino Records in 1989, featuring 10 hit recordings from 1974.

The track lineup includes five songs that reached No. 1 on the Billboard Hot 100 chart, while the remainder were Top 10 hits.

Track listing

References

See also
1974 in music

1989 compilation albums
Billboard Top Rock'n'Roll Hits albums
Pop rock compilation albums